Pasaxon is a weekly newspaper published in Laos. The newspaper was established on 13 August 1950. It is the official organ of the Lao People's Revolutionary Party, a communist party based on the principles of Marxism-Leninism and the only political party authorized in the country.

See also
List of newspapers in Laos

References

Newspapers published in Laos
Lao People's Revolutionary Party
Publications established in 1950
Communist newspapers